The Launch Vehicle Mark-3 (LVM3), previously referred as the Geosynchronous Satellite Launch Vehicle Mark III (GSLV Mk3), is a three-stage medium-lift launch vehicle developed by the Indian Space Research Organisation (ISRO). Primarily designed to launch communication satellites into geostationary orbit, it is also due to launch crewed missions under the Indian Human Spaceflight Programme. GSLV Mk III has a higher payload capacity than it's predecessor, GSLV Mk II.

After several delays and a sub-orbital test flight on 18 December 2014, ISRO successfully conducted the first orbital test launch of GSLV Mk III on 5 June 2017 from the Satish Dhawan Space Centre.

In June 2018, the Union Cabinet approved  to build 10 GSLV Mk III rockets over a five-year period.

The GSLV Mk III has launched CARE, India's space capsule recovery experiment module, Chandrayaan-2, India's second lunar mission, and will be used to carry Gaganyaan, the first crewed mission under Indian Human Spaceflight Programme. In March 2022, UK-based global communication satellite provider OneWeb entered into an agreement with ISRO to launch OneWeb satellites aboard the GSLV Mk III along with the PSLV, due to the launch services from Roscosmos being cut off, caused by the Russian Invasion of Ukraine.  The first launch took place on 22 October 2022, injecting 36 satellites for Low Earth Orbit.

History

Development 
ISRO initially planned two launcher families, the Polar Satellite Launch Vehicle for low Earth orbit and polar launches and the larger Geosynchronous Satellite Launch Vehicle for payloads to geostationary transfer orbit (GTO). The vehicle was reconceptualized as a more powerful launcher as the ISRO mandate changed. This increase in size allowed the launch of heavier communication and multipurpose satellites, human-rating to launch crewed missions, and future interplanetary exploration. Development of the GSLV Mk III began in the early 2000s, with the first launch planned for 2009–2010. The unsuccessful launch of  GSLV D3, due to a failure in the cryogenic upper stage, delayed the GSLV Mk III development program. The GSLV Mk III, while sharing a name with the GSLV, features different systems and components.

S200 static fire tests 
The first static fire test of the S200 solid rocket booster, ST-01, was conducted on 24 January 2010. The booster fired for 130 seconds and had nominal performance throughout the burn. A second static fire test, ST-02, was conducted on 4 September 2011. The booster fired for 140 seconds and again had nominal performance through the test. A third test, ST-03, was conducted on 14 June 2015 to validate the changes from the sub-orbital test flight data.

Human rated variant of S200 or HS200 was developed for the Gaganyaan programme. The first static fire test of HS200 was conducted on 13 May 2022 at SDSC SHAR for a duration of 135 seconds with no issues.

L110 static fire tests 
ISRO conducted the first static test of the L110 core stage at its Liquid Propulsion Systems Centre (LPSC) test facility at Mahendragiri, Tamil Nadu on 5 March 2010. The test was planned to last 200 seconds, but was terminated at 150 seconds after a leakage in a control system was detected. A second static fire test for the full duration was conducted on 8 September 2010.

C25 stage tests 

The first static fire test of the C25 cryogenic stage was conducted on 25 January 2017 at the ISRO Propulsion Complex (IPRC) facility at Mahendragiri, Tamil Nadu. The stage fired for a duration of 50 seconds and performed nominally.

A second static fire test for the full in-flight duration of 640 seconds was completed on 17 February 2017. This test demonstrated consistency in engine performance along with its sub-systems, including the thrust chamber, gas generator, turbopumps and control components for the full duration.

Modifications after LVM3-X 

After the suborbital test flight of GSLV Mk III, certain modifications were made to the vehicle to improve its performance. The payload fairing was modified to an ogive shape, and the S200 booster nosecones and inter-tank structure were redesigned to have better aerodynamic performance.

Vehicle design 

The first stage consists of two S200 solid motors, also known as Large Solid Boosters (LSB) attached to the core stage. It is the largest solid-fuel booster after the Space Shuttle SRBs and Ariane 5 SRBs. The flex nozzles can be vectored up to ±8° using electro-hydraulic actuators operating in blow-down mode and are used for vehicle control during the initial ascent phase. Hydraulic fluid for operating these actuators is stored in an externally mounted cylindrical tank at the base of each booster.

The L110 is the first Indian clustered liquid-fueled engine. The Vikas engines uses regenerative cooling, providing improved weight and specific impulse compared to earlier Indian rockets. Each Vikas engine can be individually gimbaled to control vehicle pitch, yaw and roll control. The L110 core stage ignites 114 seconds after liftoff and burns for 203 seconds. Since the L110 stage is air-lit, its engines need shielding during flight from the exhaust of the operating S200 boosters and reverse flow of gases by a 'nozzle closure system' which gets jettisoned prior to L110 ignition.

It is powered by a single CE-20 engine, producing  of thrust. CE-20 is the first cryogenic engine developed by India which uses a gas generator, as compared to the staged combustion engines used in GSLV.

Variants and upgrades

Mating with semi-cryogenic stage

The SCE-200 uses kerosene instead of unsymmetrical dimethylhydrazine (UDMH) as fuel and has a thrust of around 200 tonnes. The first propellant tank for the SC120 was delivered in October 2021 by HAL.

The SC120-powered version of GSLV will not be used for the crewed mission of the Gaganyaan spacecraft.

In September 2019, in an interview by AstrotalkUK, S. Somanath, director of Vikram Sarabhai Space Centre claimed that the SCE-200 engine was ready to begin testing. As per an agreement between India and Ukraine signed in 2005, Ukraine was expected to test components of the SCE-200 engine, so an upgraded version of the GSLV Mk III was not expected before 2022.

The SCE-200 engine is reported to be based on the Ukrainian RD-810, which itself is proposed for use on the Mayak family of launch vehicles.

Induction of C32 stage

The C32 stage will be re-startable and with uprated CE-20 engine. Total mass of avionics will be brought down by using miniaturised components. On 30 November 2020, Hindustan Aeronautics Limited delivered an aluminium alloy based cryogenic tank to ISRO.

On 9 November 2022, CE-20 cryogenic engine of upper stage was tested with an uprated thrust regime of 21.8 tonnes in November 2022.

On 23 December 2022, CE-20 engine E9 was hot tested for 650 second duration. For the first 40 seconds of test, the engine was operated at 20.2 tonne thrust level, after this engine was operated at 20 tonne off-nominal zones and then for 435 seconds it was operated at 22.2 tonne thrust level. With this test, the 'E9' engine has been qualified for induction in flight.

Human-rating
While the GSLV Mk III is being human rated for Gaganyaan project, the rocket was always designed with potential human spaceflight applications in consideration. The maximum acceleration during ascent phase of flight was limited to 4 Gs for crew comfort and a diameter payload fairing was used to be able to accommodate large modules like space station segments.

Furthermore, a number of changes to make safety-critical subsystems reliable are planned for lower operating margins, redundancy, stringent qualification requirements, revaluation, and strengthening of components.

Avionics:

 Quad-redundant Navigation and Guidance Computer (NGC)
 Dual chain Telemetry & Telecommand Processor (TTCP)
 Integrated Health Monitoring System (LVHM)

Launch Vehicle:

 High Thrust Vikas engines (HTVE)  of L110 core stage will operate at a chamber pressure of 58.5 bar instead of 62 bar.
 Human rated S200 (HS200) boosters will operate at chamber pressure of 55.5 bar instead of 58.8 bar. Segment joints will have three O-rings each.
Electro mechanical actuators and digital stage controllers will be employed in HS200, L110 and C25 stages.

Testing and qualification 

 On 16 December 2021, CE20 (E9 engine) was tested to demonstrate the redundancy of engine ignition capability as part of human rating LVM3. Two ignition trial tests of 3.2 seconds duration were conducted nominally followed by a nominal hot test of 50 seconds duration.
 On 12 January 2022, CE-20 engine E9 completed 720 second long qualification test for Gaganyaan programme.
 On 9 November 2022, CE-20 engine E9 was hot tested for 70 seconds. During this test the engine operated at thrust level of  approximately 20 tonnes for the first 40 seconds and then switched to an uprated thrust regime of 21.8 tonnes lasting ~30 seconds.

Notable missions

X (Suborbital flight test)
The maiden flight of the GSLV Mk III lifted off from the Second Launch Pad at the Satish Dhawan Space Center on 18 December 2014 at 04:00 UTC. The test had functional boosters, a core stage but carried dummy upper stage. It also carried the Crew Module Atmospheric Re-entry Experiment (CARE) that was tested on re-entry.

ISRO downlinked launch telemetry during the ballistic coasting phase until the radio black-out to avoid data loss in the event of a failure. CARE splashed down in the Bay of Bengal near the Andaman and Nicobar Islands and was recovered successfully.

D1 (GSAT-19) 
The first orbital flight of the GSLV Mk III occurred on 5 June 2017, lifting off from the Second Launch Pad at 11:58 UTC. The vehicle carried the GSAT-19 communication satellite, making it the heaviest Indian rocket and payload ever launched. The flight also tested upgrades to the design from data acquired during the suborbital test flight.

M1 (Chandrayaan-2) 
The first operational flight occurred on 22 July 2019, lifting off from the Second Launch pad at 9:13 UTC. The rocket carried Chandrayaan-2, India's second mission to the Moon, consisting of an orbiter, lander and a rover. The Chandrayaan-2 stack is the heaviest spacecraft launched by ISRO.

M2 (36 OneWeb satellites) 
This was the first commercial launch of GSLV Mk III that occurred on 22 October 2022, which helped India to enter the global market for heavier payloads. This was also the first launch of GSLV Mk III to a polar low earth orbit, the first multi-satellite mission and also the heaviest payload launched by ISRO to date, carrying a payload of about 6 tons.

Launch history

Planned launches

See also
 
Comparison of orbital launchers families
Comparison of orbital launch systems
Gaganyaan – Crewed Indian spacecraft
Geosynchronous Satellite Launch Vehicle
List of Indian satellites
Polar Satellite Launch Vehicle
Unified Launch Vehicle – Planned medium-to-heavy-lift rocket family to expand the Indian space program and Indian human spaceflight

Notes

References

External links

Bharat-Rakshak GSLV-III information
New Scientist article including GSLV-III diagram

Satish Dhawan Space Centre
ISRO space launch vehicles
Expendable space launch systems
Vehicles introduced in 2014